Bish Mahalleh may refer to: God, Son of God, and Holy Spirit 
 Bish Mahalleh, Amol
 Bish Mahalleh, Dabudasht, Amol County